Iceland is scheduled to compete at the 2019 European Games, in Minsk, Belarus from 21 to 30 June 2019. Iceland has previously competed at the 2015 European Games in Baku, Azerbaijan.

Archery

Compound

Badminton

Gymnastics

Artistic
Men

Women

Judo

Men

Shooting

Men

References

European Games

Nations at the 2019 European Games
2019